The 2022 Liepāja Open was a professional tennis tournament played on outdoor clay courts. It was the third edition of the tournament which was part of the 2022 ITF Women's World Tennis Tour. It took place in Liepāja, Latvia between 11 and 17 July 2022.

Champions

Singles

  Emma Navarro def.  Yuan Yue, 6–4, 6–4

Doubles

  Dalila Jakupović /  Ivana Jorović def.  Emily Appleton /  Prarthana Thombare, 6–4, 6–3

Singles main draw entrants

Seeds

 1 Rankings are as of 27 June 2022.

Other entrants
The following players received wildcards into the singles main draw:
  Maileen Nuudi
  Patrīcija Špaka
  Elza Tomase
  Beatrise Zeltiņa

The following players received entry from the qualifying draw:
  Océane Babel
  Klaudija Bubelytė
  Çağla Büyükakçay
  Martina Colmegna
  Veronika Erjavec
  Nicole Khirin
  Elena Malõgina
  Luisa Meyer auf der Heide

References

External links
 2022 Liepāja Open at ITFtennis.com

2022 ITF Women's World Tennis Tour
2022 in Latvian sport
July 2022 sports events in Europe